Jim the Penman is a 1921 American silent crime drama film produced by Whitman Bennett and distributed through Associated First National, later just First National Pictures. It is based on a well known play, Jim the Penman by Charles Lawrence Young about a forger in Victorian Britain. The film stars Lionel Barrymore and was directed by Kenneth Webb, the duo having worked on The Great Adventure previously. Jim the Penman is preserved though incomplete (reel 5 missing) at the Library of Congress.

Plot
As described in a film publication summary, James "Jim" Ralston (Barrymore) is a forger who is in love with Nina (Rankin). His first attempt at forgery is upon a dance program, and he forges Nina's name for the last waltz. He offers to save Nina's father from ruin by forging a check. He is discovered by the owner of the check, but instead of turning him in, Baron Hartfeld (Randolf) forces Jim to work for him for the next twenty years. Nina is engaged to Louis Percival (MacPherson), but through notes forged by Jim they become estranged. Nina ends up marrying James although she does not love him. As the twenty-year period closes, Jim's daughter Louise is about to marry the son of an English banker that Jim is about to ruin. Just in time Percival, whom Jim has previously ruined, and Nina discover the forgery that separated them. Jim, realizing that he is trapped, ends it all by sinking a yacht after locking himself and his companions in the cabin.

Cast
Lionel Barrymore as James Ralston
Ned Burton as Enoch Bronson
Charles Coghlan as Captain Redwood
James Laffey as E. J. Smith
Gladys Leslie as Agnes Ralston
Douglas MacPherson as Louis Percival
Anders Randolf as Baron Hartfeld
Arthur Rankin as Lord Drelincourt
Doris Rankin as Nina Bronson

See also
Jim the Penman (1915 film)
Lionel Barrymore filmography

References

External links

Jim the Penman; allmovie.com / synopsis
Lobby card and film still at the New York Public Library Digital Collections

1921 films
American silent feature films
American films based on plays
American crime drama films
1921 crime drama films
Films directed by Kenneth Webb
Films set in England
Films set in London
First National Pictures films
American black-and-white films
1921 drama films
1920s American films
Silent American drama films